Zone 7 may refer to:

Travelcard Zones 7-9, of the Transport for London zonal system
Hardiness zone, a geographically defined zone in which a specific category of plant life is capable of growing
Zone 7 of Milan